Teresa Stratas  (born May 26, 1938) is a retired operatic soprano and actress from Canada of Greek descent. She is especially well known for her award-winning recording of Alban Berg's Lulu.

Early life and career
Stratas was born Anastasia Stratakis to a struggling immigrant Cretan family in Oshawa, near Toronto, Ontario. At age 13, she performed Greek pop songs on the radio. She graduated from The Royal Conservatory of Music in Toronto. At age 20, Stratas made her professional opera debut as Mimì in La bohème at the Toronto Opera Festival. One year later in 1959, she co-won the Metropolitan Opera National Council Auditions, appearing later that year with the Metropolitan Opera as Poussette in Manon. She created the title role in Peggy Glanville-Hicks' Nausicaa at the Herod Atticus Theatre in Athens in 1961, made her Covent Garden debut as Mimì that same year and in 1962, she made her La Scala debut as Isabella in Manuel de Falla's L'Atlántida. She continued her career with the Metropolitan Opera, moved into leading roles and performed with leading opera houses around the world, including the Bolshoi, Vienna State, Berlin, Bavarian State (Munich), Paris, San Francisco and at the Salzburg Festival.

Her repertoire also included Zerlina in Don Giovanni, Despina in Così fan tutte, Cherubino and Susanna in The Marriage of Figaro, Liù in Turandot, Cio-Cio-San in Madama Butterfly, Micaëla in Carmen, Marguerite in Faust, the title role in La Périchole, Gretel in Hansel and Gretel, Lisa in The Queen of Spades, The Composer in Ariadne auf Naxos, Antonia in Les contes d'Hoffmann, Mélisande in Pelléas et Mélisande, Marenka in The Bartered Bride, Desdemona in Otello, Mme Lidoine in Dialogues des Carmélites, the title roles of Salome and Lulu, Jenny Smith in Rise and Fall of the City of Mahagonny (directed by John Dexter) and Marie Antoinette in John Corigliano's The Ghosts of Versailles. She is regarded as one of the foremost singing actresses of the twentieth century.

In March of 1962, she appeared as a contestant on the CBS Game Show "To Tell The Truth." Stratas and two other contestants had to convince the panelists that each of them was the real Teresa Stratas. Dorothy Kilgallen and Johnny Carson appeared on the episode as panelists along with Tom Poston and Dina Merrill. None of the panelists believed Stratas was really herself; giving all three contestants the top $1,000 prize to split among themselves and each received a carton of Salem cigarettes, the brand sponsoring the program.

Career highlights
Among her career highlights was the creation of the role of Sardulla in the US premiere of Menotti's The Last Savage (Met, 1964). In 1974, she made a film (directed by Götz Friedrich) of Strauss' Salome with the Vienna Philharmonic under Karl Böhm. Pierre Boulez chose her to sing the title role in the first performance of Friedrich Cerha's completed version of Alban Berg's Lulu (Paris, 1979). In 1981 she performed the role of Mimi in La bohème at the Metropolitan Opera in New York. On 26 September 1989, she sang all three soprano roles in Puccini's Trittico, Giorgetta in Il tabarro, Angelica in Suor Angelica and Lauretta in Gianni Schicchi (Met). She created the role of Marie Antoinette in the premiere of John Corigliano's The Ghosts of Versailles (Met, 1991). At the opening night of the Met's 1994 season, she sang Nedda in Pagliacci opposite Luciano Pavarotti and Giorgetta in Il tabarro opposite Plácido Domingo.

Over the course of her thirty-six year career at the Metropolitan Opera, she appeared in 385 performances of 41 different roles. Her most frequently performed roles at the house include Liu in Turandot (27 performances between 1961 and 1995), Nedda in Pagliacci (27 performances between 1963 and 1994) and Mimì in La bohème (26 performances between 1962 and 1982). Her final performance with the company was on December 9, 1995, as Jenny in The Rise and Fall of the City of Mahagonny. She was engaged to sing Marenka in a revival of The Bartered Bride during the 1996–97 season, but withdrew from the production prior to opening night, and subsequently never appeared at the Metropolitan again.

While rehearsing for Mahagonny in 1979, Stratas met the originator of her role, Lotte Lenya, who was also Kurt Weill's widow. Lenya gave her the scores of previously unpublished Weill songs which she had hoarded until that time, some of which Stratas later recorded on two albums, The Unknown Kurt Weill and Stratas Sings Weill.

She also starred in several film adaptations of operas, including Salome (1974), Amahl and the Night Visitors (1978), The Bartered Bride (1975), Pagliacci (1982) and La traviata (1983).

In 1988, she recorded the role of Julie La Verne in EMI's 3-CD set of the complete score of Kern and Hammerstein's classic musical Show Boat, conducted by John McGlinn. Also starring with her were Frederica Von Stade as Magnolia, Jerry Hadley as Gaylord Ravenal, and Bruce Hubbard as Joe. This was the first-ever complete recording of the score, using Robert Russell Bennett's original 1927 orchestrations, Will Vodery's vocal arrangements, and all of Oscar Hammerstein II's uncensored lyrics. Critics acclaimed it as the finest recording of Show Boat ever made.

In the 1980s Stratas travelled to Calcutta and worked with Mother Teresa in an orphanage and at the Kalighat Home for the Dying. In the 1990s she again took time from her career to move into a Romanian hospital to clean cots and wash and care for the sick and dying orphans.

On September 25, 2008, Teresa Stratas returned to New York for an interview with the Metropolitan Opera Guild, her first public appearance in over a decade. She lives in Florida.

Awards and recognition

 Grammy Awards & Grammy nominations
 Grammy Award for Best Opera Recording and Grammy Award for Best Classical Album for Alban Berg's Lulu (1981)
 Grammy Award for Best Opera Recording for Verdi's La traviata (1984)
 Drama Desk Award for Outstanding Actress – Musical for Rags (1987)
 Nominee for Tony Award for Best Leading Actress in a Musical for Rags (1987)
 Officer of the Order of Canada (1972)
 Artist of the Year Canadian Music Council (1980)
 Honorary LL D (McMaster University) (1986)
 Honorary LL D (University of Toronto) (1994)
 Honorary LL D (Eastman School of Music) (1998)
 Honorary D LITT (York University) (2000)
 Governor General's Performing Arts Award for Lifetime Artistic Achievement (2000)
 Star in Canada's Walk of Fame (2001)
 MasterWorks recipient for Alban Berg's Lulu (2005)

Discography
 Alban Berg, Lulu, Stratas, Yvonne Minton, Hanna Schwarz, Franz Mazura, Kenneth Riegel, Robert Tear, Orchestre de l'Opéra de Paris, cond. Pierre Boulez, Deutsche Grammophon, 1981
 Teresa Stratas – The Unknown Kurt Weill, Nonesuch 79019
 Stratas Sings Weill, Nonesuch 79131
 September Songs: The Music of Kurt Weill, Sony Classical, 1997
 Verdi, La traviata. Stratas, Fritz Wunderlich, Hermann Prey. Cond. Giuseppe Patanè. Orfeo, 1965. Live performance.
 Peggy Glanville-Hicks: Nausicaa, Scenes from the Opera. Stratas, Athens Symphony Orchestra & Chorus
 Jerome Kern, Show Boat. Stratas, Frederica von Stade, Jerry Hadley & Lillian Gish. Ambrosian Chorus & London Sinfonietta, cond. John McGlinn, EMI,
1988
 Lehár,  Die lustig Witwe. Stratas, Zoltán Kelemen, Elizabeth Harwood, René Kollo, Werner Hollweg, Berliner Philharmoniker, cond. Herbert von Karajan, Deutsche Grammophon, 1973
 Lehár, Der Zarewitsch. Stratas, Wiesław Ochman, Paul Esser, Lukas Ammann, Harald Juhnke & Birke Bruck. Symphonie–Orchester Kurt Graunke, cond. Willy Mattes, DVD, Deutsche Grammophon/Unitel Classica 00440 073 4314, 1973

Filmography
 Giuditta (1970) – Stratas, Schock – operetta F. Lehar (movie made in Germany)
 Paganini (1973) – Stratas, Theba – operetta F. Léhar directed by Wolfgang Ebert (movie made in Germany)
 Der Zarewitsch (1973) – Stratas, Ochman – operetta F. Lehar (movie made in Germany) directed by Arthur Maria Rabenalt
 Salome (1974) – title role, conducted by Karl Böhm, directed by Götz Friedrich
 The Bartered Bride (1978) – with Nicolai Gedda, and Jon Vickers, directed by John Dexter
 Rise and Fall of the City of Mahagonny (1979) – with Astrid Varnay and Richard Cassilly, directed by Dexter
 La bohème (1981) – as Mimì, with José Carreras and Renata Scotto, directed by Franco Zeffirelli
 Pagliacci (1982) – as Nedda, with Domingo, directed by Zeffirelli
 La traviata (1983) – as Violetta, with Domingo and Cornell MacNeil, directed by Zeffirelli
 Stratasphere: Portrait of Teresa Stratas (1989) – documentary
 Così fan tutte . Stratas, Edita Gruberová, Luis Lima, Ferruccio Furlanetto, Delores Ziegler, Vienna Philharmonic, cond. Nikolaus Harnoncourt. Directed by Jean-Pierre Ponnelle. Deutsche Grammophon
 The Blasphemers' Banquet (1989)
 The Ghosts of Versailles (1991) – Stratas, Fleming, Horne, Hagegård, G. Quilico, Berberian, Met Opera, cond.James Levine.  Directed by Colin Graham
 Under the Piano (1996) – Teresa Stratas, Amanda Plummer, Megan Follows. Directed by Stefan Scaini
 " The Canadians" (1961) Western starring Robert Ryan as a Mountie and directed by Burt Kennedy.Filmed in Canada.

See also
 Mozart: Così fan tutte (Alain Lombard recording)

References

External links
 
 
 Teresa Stratas, Governor General's Lifetime Artistic Achievement Award (2000)
 AvTrust – video clip of Stratas speaking about her performance of Alban Berg's Lulu
  (1978).
 Canada's Walk of Fame

1938 births
Living people
Canadian people of Greek descent
Musicians from Toronto
Canadian operatic sopranos
Grammy Award winners
Officers of the Order of Canada
The Royal Conservatory of Music alumni
Fellows of the Royal Conservatory of Music
University of Toronto alumni
Winners of the Metropolitan Opera National Council Auditions
Actresses from Toronto
20th-century Canadian actresses
Canadian musical theatre actresses
Drama Desk Award winners
Governor General's Performing Arts Award winners
Best Supporting Actress in a Television Film or Miniseries Canadian Screen Award winners